Harold "Hal" H. Carleton (c.1896 – 25 December 1949) was an Australian writer. He was a friend of film director Ken G. Hall and was part of Hall's comedy writing team at Cinesound Productions in the late 1930s. He also wrote novels.

Select credits
The Spirit of Gallipoli (1928) – screenplay
Let George Do It (1938) – original story
Dad and Dave Come to Town (1938) – uncredited contribution to screenplay
Murder Every 28 Days! – novella
They're Coming to Get Me – novella

References

External links
Hal Carleton at AustLit (subscription required)
Hal Carleton at National Film and Sound Archive

Australian writers
1890s births
1949 deaths